Saturday Nights or Saturday Evenings (Swedish: Lördagskvällar) is a 1933 Swedish comedy film directed by Schamyl Bauman and starring Edvard Persson, Dagmar Ebbesen and Eivor Kjellström. It was made at the Sundbyberg Studios of Europa Film in Stockholm. Location shooting took place around Värmdö. The film's sets were designed by the art director Bibi Lindström.

Cast
 Edvard Persson as 	Nappe Johansson
 Dagmar Ebbesen as Mrs. Engla Johansson
 Eivor Kjellström as 	Karin Johansson
 Gideon Wahlberg as Johan
 Ruth Weijden as 	Hanna
 Björn Berglund as 	Gösta
 Harald Svensson as 	Johnny Stiernhagen
 Wiola Brunius as 	Lola
 Mona Geijer-Falkner as Sofie Andersson 
 John Wilhelm Hagberg as 	Singer at the nightclub
 Rut Holm as Majken 
 Hugo Jacobsson as 	Guest at the nightclub 
 John Melin as 	Guest at the nightclub 
 Robert Ryberg as 	Maitre d' at 'Walencia' 
 Rulle Bohman as Abel 
 Eva Sachtleben as Kristin, Abel's wife 
 Hanny Schedin as Dancing woman at the nightclub
 Alf Östlund as Guest at the nightclub

References

Bibliography 
 Wallengren, Ann-Kristin.  Welcome Home Mr Swanson: Swedish Emigrants and Swedishness on Film. Nordic Academic Press, 2014.

External links 
 

1933 films
Swedish comedy films
1933 comedy films
1930s Swedish-language films
Films directed by Schamyl Bauman
1930s Swedish films